was a Japanese film director and screenwriter, who directed about one hundred films during his career between 1923 and 1956. His most acclaimed works include The Story of the Last Chrysanthemums (1939), The Life of Oharu (1952), Ugetsu (1953), and Sansho the Bailiff (1954), with the latter three all being awarded at the Venice International Film Festival. A recurring theme of his films was the oppression of women in historical and contemporary Japan. Together with Akira Kurosawa and Yasujirō Ozu, Mizoguchi is seen as a representative of the "golden age" of Japanese cinema. David Thomson writes that "The use of camera to convey emotional ideas or intelligent feelings is the definition of cinema derived from Mizoguchi's films. He is supreme in the realization of internal states in external views." Orson Welles said of Mizoguchi, "He can't be praised enough, really."

Biography

Early years
Mizoguchi was born in Hongō, Tokyo, as the second of three children, to Zentaro Miguchi, a roofing carpenter, and his wife Masa. The family's background was relatively humble until the father's failed business venture of selling raincoats to the Japanese troops during the Russo-Japanese War. The family was forced to move to the downtown district of Asakusa and gave Mizoguchi's older sister Suzu up for adoption, which in effect meant selling her into the geisha profession.

In 1911, Mizoguchi's parents, too poor to continue paying for their son's primary school training, sent him to stay with an uncle in Morioka in northern Japan for a year, where he finished primary school. His return coincided with an onset of crippling rheumatoid arthritis, which left him with a walking gait for the rest of his life. In 1913, his sister Suzu secured him an apprenticeship as a designer for a yukata manufacturer, and in 1915, after the mother's death, she brought both her younger brothers into her own house. Mizoguchi enrolled for a course at the Aoibashi Yoga Kenkyuko art school in Tokyo, which taught Western painting techniques, and developed an interest in opera, particularly at the Royal Theatre at Akasaka where he helped the set decorators with set design and construction.

In 1917, his sister again helped him to find work, this time as an advertisement designer with the Yuishin Nippon newspaper in Kobe. The film critic Tadao Sato has pointed out a coincidence between Mizoguchi's life in his early years and the plots of  dramas, which characteristically documented the sacrifices made by geisha on behalf of the young men they were involved with. Probably because of his familial circumstances, "the subject of women's suffering is fundamental in all his work; while sacrifice – in particular, the sacrifice a sister makes for a brother – makes a key showing in a number of his films, including some of the greatest ones (Sansho the Bailiff/Sansho Dayu [1954], for example)." After less than a year in Kobe, however, Mizoguchi returned "to the bohemian delights of Tokyo" (Mark Le Fanu). In 1920, Mizoguchi entered the film industry as an assistant director at the Nikkatsu studios in Mukojima, Tokyo. Three years later, he gave his directorial debut with Ai ni yomigaeru hi (The Resurrection of Love).

Film career
After the 1923 earthquake in Tokyo, Mizoguchi moved to Nikkatsu's studios in Kyoto. His early works included remakes of German Expressionist cinema and adaptations of Eugene O'Neill and Leo Tolstoy. While working in Kyoto, he studied kabuki and noh theatre, and traditional Japanese dance and music. He was also a frequent visitor of the tea houses, dance halls and brothels in Kyoto and Osaka, which at one time resulted in a widely covered incident of him being attacked by a jealous prostitute and then-lover with a razor. His 1926 Passion of a Woman Teacher (Kyōren no onna shishō) was one of a handful of Japanese films shown in France and Germany at the time and received considerate praise, but is nowadays lost like most of his 1920s and early 1930s films. By the end of the decade, Mizoguchi directed a series of left-leaning "tendency films", including Tokyo March and Metropolitan Symphony (Tokai kokyōkyoku). 

In 1932, Mizoguchi left Nikkatsu and worked for a variety of studios and production companies. The Water Magician (1933) and Orizuru Osen (1935) were melodramas based on stories by Kyōka Izumi, depicting women who sacrifice themselves to secure a poor young man's education. Both have been cited as early examples of his reccurring theme of female concerns and "one-scene-one-shot" camera technique, which would become his trademark. The 1936 diptych of Osaka Elegy and Sisters of the Gion, about modern young women (moga) rebelling against their surroundings, is considered to be his early masterpiece. Mizoguchi himself named these two films as the works with which he achieved artistic maturity. Osaka Elegy was also his first full sound film, and marked the beginning of his long collaboration with screenwriter Yoshikata Yoda.

1939, the year when Mizoguchi became president of the Directors Guild of Japan, saw the release of The Story of the Last Chrysanthemums, which is regarded by many critics as his major pre-war, if not his best work. Here, a young woman supports her partner's struggle to achieve artistic maturity as a kabuki actor at the price of her health.

During World War II, Mizoguchi made a series of films whose patriotic nature seemed to support the war effort. The most famous of these is a retelling of the classic samurai tale The 47 Ronin (1941–42), an epic jidaigeki (historical drama). While some historians see these as works which he had been pressured into, others believe him to have acted voluntarily. Fellow screenwriter Matsutarō Kawaguchi went as far as, in an 1964 interview for Cahiers du Cinéma, calling Mizoguchi (whom he otherwise held in high regards) an "opportunist" in his art who followed the currents of the time, veering from the left to the right to finally become a democrat. 

1941 also saw the permanent hospitalisation of his wife Chieko (m. 1927), whom he erroneously believed to have contracted with venereal disease.

International recognition

During the early post-war years following the country's defeat, Mizoguchi directed a series of films concerned with the oppression of women and female emancipation both in historical (mostly the Meiji era) and contemporary settings. All of these were written or co-written by Yoda, and often starred Kinuyo Tanaka, who remained his regular leading actress until 1954, when both fell out with each other over Mizoguchi's attempt to prevent her from directing her first own film. Utamaro and His Five Women (1946) was a notable exception of an Edo era jidaigeki film made during the Occupation, as this genre was seen as being inherently nationalistic or militaristic by the Allied censors. Of his works of this period, Flame of My Love (1949) has repeatedly been pointed out for its unflinching presentation of its subject. Tanaka plays a young teacher who leaves her traditionalist milieu to strive for her goal of female liberation, only to find out that her allegedly progressive partner still nourishes the accustomed attitude of male preeminence.

Mizoguchi returned to feudal era settings with The Life of Oharu (1952), Ugetsu (1953) and Sansho the Bailiff (1954), which won him international recognition, in particular by the Cahiers du Cinéma critics such as Jean-Luc Godard, Eric Rohmer and Jacques Rivette, and were awarded at the Venice Film Festival. While The Life of Oharu follows the social decline of a woman banished from the Imperial court during the Edo era, Ugetsu and Sansho the Bailiff examine the brutal effects of war and reigns of violence on small communities and families. In between these three films, he directed A Geisha (1953) about the pressures put upon women working in Kyoto's post-war pleasure district. After two historical films shot in colour (Tales of the Taira Clan and Princess Yang Kwei Fei, both 1955), Mizoguchi once more explored a contemporary milieu (a brothel in the Yoshiwara district) in black-and-white format with his last film, the 1956 Street of Shame.

Mizoguchi died of leukemia at the age of 58 in the Kyoto Municipal Hospital. At the time of his death, Mizoguchi was working on the script of An Osaka Story, which was later realised by Kōzaburō Yoshimura.

Legacy
In 1975, Kaneto Shindō, a set designer, chief assistant director and scenarist for Mizoguchi in the late 1930s and 1940s, released a documentary about his former mentor, Kenji Mizoguchi: The Life of a Film Director, as well as publishing a book on him in 1976. Already with his autobiographical debut film Story of a Beloved Wife (1951), Shindō had paid reference to Mizoguchi in the shape of the character "Sakaguchi", a director who nurtures a young aspiring screenwriter.

Mizoguchi's films have regularly appeared in "best film" polls, such as Sight & Sound's "The 100 Greatest Films of All Time" (Ugetsu and Sansho the Bailiff) and Kinema Junpo's "Kinema Junpo Critics' Top 200" (The Life of Oharu, Ugetsu and The Crucified Lovers). A retrospective of his 30 extant films, presented by the Museum of the Moving Image and the Japan Foundation, toured several American cities in 2014. Among the directors who have admired Mizoguchi's work are Akira Kurosawa, Orson Welles, Andrei Tarkovsky, Martin Scorsese, Werner Herzog, Theo Angelopoulos and many others.

Filmography

Lost films (except where noted)
 1923: The Resurrection of Love (Ai ni yomigaeru hi)
 1923: Hometown (Kokyō)
 1923: Dreams of Youth (Seishun no yumeji)
 1923: City of Desire (Joen no chimata)
 1923: Song of Failure (Haisan no uta wa kanashi)
 1923: 813: The Adventures of Arsène Lupin (813)
 1923: Foggy Harbour (Kiri no minato)
 1923: The Night (Yoru)
 1923: In the Ruins (Haikyo no naka)
 1923: Blood and Soul (Chi to rei)
 1923: Song of the Mountain Pass (Tōge no uta)
 1924: The Sad Idiot (Kanashiki hakuchi)
 1924: Death at Dawn (Aka tsuki no shi)
 1924: Queen of Modern Times (Gendai no joō)
 1924: Strong is the Female (Jose wa tsuyoshi)
 1924: This Dusty World (Jinkyō)
 1924: Turkeys in a Row (Shichimenchō no yukue)
 1924: The Death of a Police Officer (Itō junsa no shi) co-direction
 1924: Chronicle of the May Rain (Samidare zōshi)
 1924: Love-Breaking Axe (Koi o tatsu ono) co-direction
 1924: Kanraku no onna (A Woman of Pleasure)
 1924: Queen of the Circus (Kyokubadan no Jo)
 1925: Ah, Special Battleship Kanto (Ā tokumukan Kanto) co-direction
 1925: Uchien Puchan
 1925: Out of College (Gakusō o idete)
 1925: The Earth Smiles: Part 1 (Daichi wa hohoemu: Daiichibu)
 1925: The White Lily Laments (Shirayuki wa nageku)
 1925: Shining in the Red Sunset (Akai yūki ni terasarete)
 1925: The Song of Home (Furusato no uta) Earliest extant film
 1925: Street Sketches (Shōhin eigashū: Machi no suketchi) co-direction
 1925: Human Being (Ningen)
 1925: General Nogi and Kuma-San (Nogi Taisho to Kuma-San)
 1926: The Copper Coin King (Dōkaō)
 1926: A Paper Doll's Whisper of Spring (Kaminingyō haru no sasayaki)
 1926: My Faultn New Version (Shinsetsu ono ga tsumi)
 1926: Passion of a Woman Teacher (Kyōren no onna shishō)
 1926: The Boy of the Sea (Kaikoku danji)
 1926: Money (Kane)
 1927: The Imperial Grace (Kōon)
 1927: The Cuckoo (Jihishinchō)
 1928: A Man's Life: Money is Everything in Life (Hito no isshō: Jinsei banji kane no maki)
 1928: A Man's Life: This Floating World is Hard (Hito no isshō: Ukiyo wa tsurai ne no maki)
 1928: A Man's Life: Bear and Tiger Meet Again (Hito no isshō: Kuma to tora saikai no maki)
 1928: My Lovely Daughter (Musume kawaiya)
 1929: Bridge of Japan (Nihonbashi)
 1929: The Morning Sun Shines (Asahi wa kagayaku) co-direction Few minutes preserved
 1929: Tokyo March (Tōkyō kōshinkyoku) Few minutes preserved
 1929: Metropolitan Symphony (Tokai kokyōkyoku)
 1930: Hometown (Fujiwara Yoshie no furusato) Extant film
 1930: Okichi, Mistress of a Foreigner (Tōjin Okichi) Few minutes preserved
 1931: And Yet They Go On (Shikamo karera wa yuku)
 1932: The Man of the Moment (Toki no ujigami)
 1932: The Dawn of Manchuria and Mongolia (Manmō kenkoku no reimei)
 1933: The Water Magician (Taki no shiraito) Extant film
 1933: Gion Festival (Gion matsuri)
 1934: The Jinpu Group (Jimpūren)
 1934: The Mountain Pass of Love and Hate (Aizō tōge)
Extant films (except where noted)
 1935: The Downfall of Osen (Orizuru Osen)
 1935: Oyuki the Virgin (マリヤのお雪, Mariya no Oyuki)
 1935: The Poppy (Gubijinsō)
 1936: Osaka Elegy (Naniwa erejī)
 1936: Sisters of the Gion (Gion no kyōdai)
 1937: The Straits of Love and Hate (愛怨峡, Aien kyō)
 1938: Song of the Camp (Roei no uta)
 1939: The Story of the Last Chrysanthemums (Zangiku monogatari)
 1940: A Woman of Osaka (Naniwa onna) Lost film
 1941: The Life of an Actor (Geidō Ichidai Otoko)
 1941–42: The 47 Ronin a.k.a. The Loyal 47 Ronin of the Genroku Era (Genroku chūshingura)
 1944: Three Generations of Danjuro (Danjurō sandai)
 1944: Miyamoto Musashi (宮本武蔵)
 1945: The Famous Sword (名刀美女丸 Meitō Bijomaru)
 1945: Victory Song (Hisshōka) co-direction with Masahiro Makino and Hiroshi Shimizu
 1946: Victory of Women (女性の勝利, Josei no shōri)
 1946: Utamaro and His Five Women (Utamaro o meguru gonin no onna)
 1947: The Love of Sumako the Actress (Joyū Sumako no koi)
 1948: Women of the Night (夜の女たち, Yoru no onnatachi)
 1949: Flame of My Love (Waga koi wa moenu)
 1950: Portrait of Madame Yuki a.k.a. A Picture of Madame Yuki (Yuki fujin ezu)
 1951: Miss Oyu (Oyū-sama)
 1951: The Lady of Musashino (Musashino fujin)
 1952: The Life of Oharu (Saikaku ichidai onna)
 1953: Ugetsu (Ugetsu monogatari)
 1953: A Geisha a.k.a. Gion Festival Music (Gion bayashi)
 1954: Sansho the Bailiff (Sanshō dayū)
 1954: The Woman in the Rumor a.k.a. The Crucified Woman (Uwasa no onna)
 1954: The Crucified Lovers a.k.a. A Story from Chikamatsu (Chikamatsu monogatari)
 1955: Princess Yang Kwei Fei (Yōkihi)
 1955: Tales of the Taira Clan (Shin heike monogatari)
 1956: Street of Shame (Akasen chitai)

Home media releases (English subtitled)
 Late Mizoguchi (Oyū-sama, Ugetsu monogatari, Gion bayashi, Sanshō dayū, Uwasa no onna, Chikamatsu monogatari, Yōkihi, Akasen chitai) – Eureka! Masters of Cinema (region B Blu-ray)
 The Mizoguchi Collection (Osaka Elegy, Sisters of the Gion, The Story of the Last Chrysanthemum, Utamaro and His Five Women) – Artificial Eye (region B Blu-ray, region 2 PAL DVD)
 Kenji Mizoguchi's Fallen Women (Osaka Elegy, Sisters of the Gion, Women of the Night, Street of Shame) – The Criterion Collection (region 1 NTSC)
 The Story of the Last Chrysanthemum (Zangiku monogatari, 1939) – Artificial Eye (region B Blu-ray), Shochiku Home Video (Region A Blu-ray), The Criterion Collection (region 1 NTSC DVD, region A Blu-ray)
 The 47 Ronin (Genroku chūshingura, 1941) – Image Entertainment (region 0 NTSC DVD), UniOne Media (Region 0 NTSC DVD)
 The Lady of Musashino (Musashino fujin, 1951) – Artificial Eye (region 2 PAL)
 The Life of Oharu (Saikaku ichidai onna, 1952) – Artificial Eye (region 2 PAL DVD), The Criterion Collection (region 1 NTSC DVD, region A or B Blu-ray) 
 Ugetsu monogatari (1953) – Bo Ying (Region 0 PAL DVD), Eureka! Masters of Cinema (region 2 NTSC DVD, region B Blu-ray), The Criterion Collection (region 1 NTSC DVD, region A Blu-ray)
 Chikamatsu monogatari (1954) - Eureka! Masters of Cinema (region 2 NTSC DVD)
 Talking Silents 1 (The Water Magician, Tokyo March) – Digital MEME (region 2 NTSC DVD)
 Talking Silents 2 (The Downfall of Osen, Okichi, Mistress of a Foreigner) – Digital MEME (region 2 NTSC DVD)

References

External links

 

1898 births
1956 deaths
Japanese film directors
Recipients of the Medal with Purple Ribbon
Recipients of the Order of the Sacred Treasure, 4th class
Samurai film directors
Converts to Buddhism